Sir Reginald Henry Craddock,  (11 March 1864 – 10 February 1937) was a British colonial official and politician, who served in the Indian Civil Service and as Lieutenant-governor of Burma. He later became a Conservative Party Member of Parliament (MP) and sat on the Joint Committee on Indian Constitutional Reform as a strong opponent of Indian nationalism.

Life
Craddock's father Surgeon Major William Craddock had been attached to the 1st Gurkha Rifles; he was therefore born into a family with strong links to the British Raj. He studied at the prestigious Wellington College before going on to Keble College, Oxford. He qualified for the Indian Civil Service in 1882, and two years later was sent on his first posting to the Central Provinces.

Craddock spent many years in the Central Provinces, moving steadily up the civil service ladder. He was an industrious worker and his diligence was duly recognized by the authorities. From 1893 onwards, he held the following positions in succession: Commissioner of Excise; head of the Nagpur District; Chief Secretary to the head of the Province; Commissioner of the Nagpur Division; and finally Chief Commissioner (or governor of the province) in 1907.

He was appointed a Companion of the Order of the Star of India (CSI) in the 1903 Durbar Honours, and in 1911 promoted to a Knigh Commander in the order (KCSI). In 1923 he was appointed a Knight Grand Commander in the Order of the Indian Empire (GCIE).

At the 1931 general election, he was elected as Member of Parliament for  the Combined English Universities, and held the seat until his death in 1937.

Titles
1864–1902: Reginald Henry Craddock
1903–1911: Reginald Henry Craddock, CSI
1911–1923: Sir Reginald Henry Craddock, KCSI
1923–1937: Sir Reginald Henry Craddock, GCIE, KCSI

Publications

References

External links
 Myanmar (Burma) at www.worldstatesmen.org

1864 births
1937 deaths
Indian Civil Service (British India) officers
Knights Grand Commander of the Order of the Indian Empire
Knights Commander of the Order of the Star of India
Conservative Party (UK) MPs for English constituencies
Members of the Parliament of the United Kingdom for the Combined English Universities
UK MPs 1931–1935
UK MPs 1935–1945
Administrators in British Burma
Alumni of Keble College, Oxford